NH 63 may refer to:

 National Highway 63 (India)
 New Hampshire Route 63, United States